George Stephen House (also known as the Mount Stephen Club Building) is a historic mansion located in what was the Golden Square Mile in Montreal, Quebec, Canada. The building is situated on Drummond Street in Downtown Montreal, between De Maisonneuve Boulevard and Saint Catherine Street. It is best known for being the home of the Mount Stephen Club from 1926 to 2011.

History
The mansion was built for George Stephen, 1st Baron Mount Stephen (1829–1921). It has been used by various Hollywood stars for period films. These stars include Alec Baldwin, Christopher Plummer, Eric Roberts, Jennifer Love Hewitt and Richard Chamberlain.

The mansion was designated a National Historic Site of Canada in 1971, as the best example of a Renaissance Revival house in Canada, and due to its association with George Stephen.

Gallery
Exterior

Interior

References

External links

Official website

Downtown Montreal
Heritage buildings of Quebec
Houses completed in 1883
Houses in Montreal
National Historic Sites in Quebec
Renaissance Revival architecture in Canada
William Tutin Thomas buildings